Intrado, formerly West Corporation, is an American telecommunications company. It became a subsidiary of Apollo Global Management on October 11, 2017.

Business Operations

Intrado reorganized in five main segments: Cloud Collaboration, Life and Safety (including 911 operations), Enterprise Communications, Digital Media (including streaming operations), and Health and Wellness (including healthcare claims and customer support) in 2019.  It spun out its telemarketing brand to West Revenue Generation Services (WRGS), also owned by Apollo Global Management in 2019

History

Gary and Mary West co-founded WATS Marketing of America in 1978. The couple left the company in 1985 and Mary West founded West Teleservices with Troy Eaden in 1986. Gary West joined West Teleservices one year later as chairman.

During the first decade, West Teleservices hired thousands of employees and reached over $100 million in net proceeds. West Teleservices expanded their products through a series of acquisitions, including Tel Mark Sales Inc., Intercall, Televox, and HyperCube.

In November 1996, West went public with 2,000 employees.

In 2002, West acquired Tel Mark Sales, Dakotah Direct, and Attention, LLC.
The following year, West acquired conferencing company InterCall and ConferenceCall.com.

In 2006, West which had been publicly traded since 1996, recapitalized under the sponsorship of investor groups led by Thomas H. Lee Partners and Quadrangle Group. Gary and Mary West continued to maintain 25 percent of the company.

In January 2015, West announced the sale of its agent services businesses to Alorica. The sale closed in early March 2015.

In October 2017, West was purchased by Apollo Global Management, a New York-based private equity firm, for $5.2 billion.

On August 31, 2018 West Corporation laid off 148 employees between their Middleton, WI and Green Bay, WI location after losing a major contract.

On June 25, 2019 West Corporation rebrands itself as Intrado reflecting both the evolution of the company as well as its vision for the future as a global leader of technology-enabled services.

On December 20, 2020 Intrado acquires Asparia, a leading provider of patient engagement solutions for health systems, hospitals, and medical practices.

Name history

Nov 1996: West TeleServices Corporation

January 1, 2001: West Corporation  

June 25, 2019: Intrado

Controversies
Intrado has had a history of being the responsible party for several technical issues causing 911 outages across many states in the United States. 

In April 2014, Intrado was partially responsible for a 14-state 911 outage that affected an estimated 11 million people and 6,000 emergency help calls. As a result, the FCC fined Intrado $1.4 million.

In November 2019, Intrado agreed to pay $175,000 to the US Treasury due to glitches in their system that occurred in August 2018 that left millions without access to 911 access for 65 minutes across 6 states.

In September 2020, 911 outages were reported across 14 states for more than an hour due in part to Intrado.

Acquisitions

Between 2002 and 2013, West Corporation invested approximately $2.7 billion in strategic acquisitions.

West has acquired:

Awards

 April 2013 National College and West Corporation & Business Solutions Distinguished Community Employer

References

Companies based in Omaha, Nebraska
Companies established in 1986
Telecommunications companies of the United States
1986 establishments in Nebraska